Rev. Harold Lloyd Henderson (1907 - January 18, 1993) was a Presbyterian minister and politician in Manitoba, Canada.

Life and work
H. Lloyd Henderson was born in Freeland, Prince Edward Island, and attended schools in Freeland, Summerside, Prince of Wales College in  Charlottetown, Prince Edward Island, and at McGill University and Presbyterian College in Montreal, where he completed his studies in 1942.

He was ordained by his home Presbytery in Prince Edward Island on January 14, 1943, and became Minister of the First Presbyterian Church in Portage la Prairie, Manitoba.
He retired in 1981, when he was designated "Minister Emeritus". He also served as Presbytery and Synod Moderator, and was a frequent Commissioner to the Presbyterian Church's in Canada's General Assembly.

With proximity to the Church and City Hall (they are side by side), Henderson was mayor of Portage la Prairie, Manitoba from 1947 to 1966, and again from 1971 to 1974. He served on a number of committees associated to the political office. He ran as a candidate for the leadership of the Liberal Party of Canada at its leadership conventions in 1958 and 1968. He received only one vote in his first attempt, even though he was not a delegate, and none in his second. Henderson claimed that he did not vote for himself on the former occasion and it was reported to United Press International that he received a courtesy vote from the Liberal Party. He was nicknamed, in the press, as "one vote Henderson."

Henderson also ran for the leadership of the Manitoba Liberal Party on three occasions. He received 27 votes in 1961, finishing fourth out of four candidates. He fell to 16 votes in 1969, again finishing fourth out of four. In 1975, he was the only opponent of Charles Huband, losing by 381 votes to 87. He never sought election to the provincial legislature.

In the 1958 federal election, Henderson was a Liberal candidate in the former riding of Portage—Neepawa, placing a distant second. He then ran as an "independent" candidate (listing occupations as Administrator, economist and clergyman) in the same riding in the 1962 and 1963 elections, placing last each time.

He died in early 1993, and is buried in his hometown in Prince Edward Island.

1907 births
1993 deaths
Canadian Presbyterian ministers
Mayors of places in Manitoba
People from Prince County, Prince Edward Island
Liberal Party of Canada leadership candidates
Prince of Wales College alumni
McGill University alumni